Alexander Garth MacLaren Watson (born 27 February 1945) is an English former cricketer. He was a left-handed batsman who bowled right-arm fast-medium.

Watson made his first-class debut for Oxford University against Gloucestershire in 1965 and made in total 41 first-class appearances for the University, his final match coming in the 1968 University Match against Cambridge University. He won cricket Blues in 1965, 1966, and 1968.

He scored 666 runs for the University at a batting average of 13.05, with a single half century score of 65* against Essex in 1966. With the ball he took 68 wickets at a bowling average of 39.38, with a single five wicket haul against Cambridge University in 1965. He took 14 catches. He also played a first-class match for Oxford and Cambridge Universities against the touring Australians in 1968.

In 1973 Watson made his debut for Dorset in his only List-A match, against Staffordshire in the 1973 Gillette Cup. He took 3 wickets for 39 runs, leaving him with a bowling average in List-A cricket of 13.00.

During the same season Watson made his Minor Counties Championship debut against Berkshire. From 1973 to 1979 he played 22 Minor Counties matches for Dorset, with his final Minor Counties match for the county coming against Devon.

External links

1945 births
Living people
Cricketers from Lucknow
Alumni of Corpus Christi College, Oxford
English cricketers
Oxford University cricketers
Dorset cricketers
Oxford and Cambridge Universities cricketers